The men's 10,000 metres event at the 2001 European Athletics U23 Championships was held in Amsterdam, Netherlands, at Olympisch Stadion on 12 July.

Medalists

Results

Final
12 July

Participation
According to an unofficial count, 14 athletes from 10 countries participated in the event.

 (2)
 (1)
 (1)
 (1)
 (1)
 (2)
 (3)
 (1)
 (1)
 (1)

References

10000 metres
10,000 metres at the European Athletics U23 Championships